The year 1674 in science and technology involved some significant events.

Biology
 Antonie van Leeuwenhoek discovers infusoria using the microscope.

Pharmacology
 Thomas Willis publishes Pharmaceutice rationalis.

Births

Deaths
 Jean Pecquet, French anatomist (born 1622)

References

 
17th century in science
1670s in science